George J. Gottwald (May 12, 1914 – March 11, 2002) was an American Bishop of the Catholic Church. He served as an auxiliary bishop of the Archdiocese of St. Louis from 1961 to 1988.

Biography
Born in St. Louis, Missouri, George Joseph Gottwald was ordained a priest for the Archdiocese of St. Louis on June 9, 1940.  On June 23, 1961 Pope John XXIII appointed him as the Titular Bishop of Cedamusa and Auxiliary Bishop of St. Louis.  He was consecrated a bishop by Cardinal Joseph Ritter on August 8, 1961. The principal co-consecrators were Bishops John Cody of Kansas City-St. Joseph and Leo Byrne of Wichita.  He continued to serve as an auxiliary bishop until his resignation was accepted by Pope John Paul II on August 2, 1988.  He died at the age of 87 on March 11, 2002.

References

1914 births
2002 deaths
Clergy from St. Louis
Roman Catholic Archdiocese of St. Louis
20th-century American Roman Catholic titular bishops
Religious leaders from Missouri